Hall Russell United Football Club are a Scottish football club based in Bridge of Don, a suburb of Aberdeen. Members of the Scottish Junior Football Association, they currently play in the SJFA North Superleague. Founded in 1968 as an Amateur club, the club joined the SJFA in 1989. Their home ground is Denmore Park and club colours are navy blue.

The club are related to a previous Junior side, Hall Russell's F.C.. This club, existing from 1915 to 1963, were a works team of the Hall Russell shipyard in Aberdeen. They reached the final of the Scottish Junior Cup in 1929–30, losing 3–0 to Newtongrange Star at Tynecastle Park in front of 17,000 spectators.

After the 2021–22 North Superleague ended, Hall Russell United went into abeyance.

Honours
 North Region Cup: 1992–93
 North East Division One winners: 1989–90

References

External links
 Club website 
 Non-league Scotland
 Scottish Football Historical Archive

Football clubs in Aberdeen
Football clubs in Scotland
Scottish Junior Football Association clubs
Association football clubs established in 1968
1968 establishments in Scotland